Abodunrin Gabriel Olaseni (born 29 December 1991) is a British professional basketball player for Darüşşafaka of the Turkish Basketbol Süper Ligi (BSL). He also plays for the Great Britain men's national basketball team.

Professional career
Olaseni went undrafted in the 2015 NBA draft. In July 2015, he joined the Miami Heat for the 2015 NBA Summer League. On 23 July 2015 he signed with German club Brose Baskets. On 22 November 2015 he was loaned to Gießen 46ers for the rest of the 2015–16 season.

On 13 July 2016 Olaseni signed with Italian club Dinamo Sassari. On 3 March 2017 he parted ways with Sassari. The next day he signed with French club Orléans Loiret Basket for the rest of the 2017–18 Pro A season.

On 23 August 2017 Olaseni signed with Fuenlabrada for the 2017–18 season.

For the 2018–19 season, he signed with s.Oliver Würzburg of the German Bundesliga. He played in the 2019 FIBA Europe Cup Finals with s.Oliver, where he lost to his former team Dinamo Sassari.

On August 13, 2019, he has signed with Bursaspor of the Turkish Basketball Super League.

On August 10, 2020, he has signed with Büyükçekmece Basketbol of the Turkish Basketbol Süper Ligi (BSL). Olaseni averaged 15.6 points and 9.1 rebounds per game.

On July 3, 2021, he signed with Darüşşafaka.

National team career
Olaseni has established himself as a key member of the Great Britain men's national team. He is the most efficient scorer in GB national team history with a career field goal percentage of .647 (165/255) as of 25 February 2020.

Olaseni had a breakout performance at FIBA EuroBasket 2017 with averages of 16.8 points (11th) and 11.2 rebounds (2nd). He led all players in defensive rebounding per game (8.8) and earned the highest efficiency rating per game (26.8). Matched up against NBA star Kristaps Porziņģis, Olaseni scored a career high 23 points on 10 for 11 shooting in their game against Latvia.

Career statistics

EuroLeague

|-
| style="text-align:left;"| 2015–16
| style="text-align:left;" | Brose Bamberg
| 5 || 2 || 13.2 || .417 || –|| 1.000 || 2.8 || .6 || .2 || .4 || 2.4 || 1.2
|-
|- class="sortbottom"
| style="text-align:center;" colspan="2"| Career
| 5 || 2 || 13.2 || .417 || –|| 1.000 || 2.8 || .6 || .2 || .4 || 2.4 || 1.2
|}

References

External links
Gabriel Olaseni at acb.com

Gabriel Olaseni at fiba.com
Gabriel Olaseni at legabasket.it
Gabriel Olaseni at lnb.fr
Gabriel Olaseni at tblstat.net

1991 births
Living people
Baloncesto Fuenlabrada players
Basketball players from Greater London
Black British sportspeople
British expatriate basketball people
British expatriate basketball people in Germany
British expatriate basketball people in France
British expatriate basketball people in Italy
British expatriate basketball people in Spain
British expatriate basketball people in the United States
Brose Bamberg players
Bursaspor Basketbol players
Büyükçekmece Basketbol players
Centers (basketball)
Darüşşafaka Basketbol players
Dinamo Sassari players
English men's basketball players
Giessen 46ers players
Iowa Hawkeyes men's basketball players
Lega Basket Serie A players
Liga ACB players
Orléans Loiret Basket players
People from Plaistow, Newham
S.Oliver Würzburg players